The Ducrot SLD was an Italian fighter prototype built by Ducrot in 1918.

Design and development
During the latter half of World War I, Ing Manlio Stiavelli and Guido Luzzatti of the firm of Vittorio Ducrot at Palermo designed a high-performance fighter in an attempt to allow the company to progress from license production of flying boats designed elsewhere to producer of originally designed aircraft. Emphasizing aerodynamic cleanliness, they designed the SLD (for "Stiavelli-Luzzatti-Ducrot"), a single-seat biplane fighter powered by the 149-kilowatt (200-horsepower) Hispano-Suiza 35 engine driving a two-bladed propeller. It had a plywood monocoque fuselage of oval section. The undercarriage struts extended through the lower wing to carry the fuselage above the lower wing.

Operational history
Testing of the SLD began in October 1918, but its results have been lost. No production order from the Corpo Aeronautico Militare (Italian Royal Air Force) ensued, and only one prototype was built.

Operators

Corpo Aeronautico Militare

Specifications

Notes

References
 

1910s Italian fighter aircraft
SLD
Aircraft first flown in 1918